Shameer Mon Naseema Manzile (born 20 October 1983) is an Indian former athlete. He comes from Kerala.

Shameer won a bronze medal as a member of India's 4 x 100 metres relay team at the 2010 Commonwealth Games, which set a national record in the final.

At the 2010 Asian Games he was fourth in the 4 × 100 metres relay final, in which he was the team's third runner. The result was annulled when it was revealed that teammate Suresh Sathya had tested positive for nandrolone prior to the games.

References

External links
Shameer Mon Naseema Manzile at the IAAF

1983 births
Living people
Indian male sprinters
Athletes (track and field) at the 2010 Asian Games
Athletes (track and field) at the 2010 Commonwealth Games
Commonwealth Games bronze medallists for India
Commonwealth Games medallists in athletics
Athletes from Kerala
Asian Games competitors for India
21st-century Indian people
Medallists at the 2010 Commonwealth Games